Harold H. Seward (July 24, 1930 – June 19, 2012) was a computer scientist, engineer, and inventor.   Seward developed the radix sort and counting sort algorithms in 1954 at MIT. He also worked on the Whirlwind Computer and developed instruments that powered the guidance systems for the Apollo spacecraft and Polaris missile.

References

American computer scientists
Norwich University alumni
American inventors
American physicists
20th-century American engineers
1930 births
2012 deaths